Andrea Klára Osvárt (born 25 April 1979) is a Hungarian actress, film producer, and former fashion model.

Personal life 
She was born in Budapest and grew up in Tamási, a small town in the south of Hungary. Her parents divorced when she was five. Her father is a veterinarian. She has four siblings: Judit, Roxána, András, and Márton. Osvárt attended N.2. Public School in Tamási, Zoltán Kodály Italian-Hungarian High School, and majored in Italian studies at the Faculty of Humanities of Eötvös Loránd University, Budapest.

She is fluent in Hungarian, English and Italian, and speaks some German and French.

Career
She began modeling at the age of 16 and subsequently came second in the Hungarian "Look of the Year" competition in 1996. She moved to Budapest and began modeling professionally in Europe, Asia, and North America. She has also made more than 30 television commercials.

She played a small role in the film Spy Game, which starred Robert Redford and Brad Pitt. She decided to leave behind modeling and focus on her acting career. She attended one year at the Földessy Margit Acting School in Budapest. She was later admitted in the biennial International Acting School in Rome, Italy, where she has lived since 2003. She also attended a screen-writing course at the Schilling-Moharos Screenwriter School in Hungary.

The 2018 short film, Susotázs, in which she plays, made the Oscar Shortlist in the Live Action Short Film category for the 91st Academy Awards.

Current positions:
2012 – 
Managing Director, Amego Film Kft.
http://www.amegofilm.com/

2020 – 2021
Community Chief Patron at Margit Negyed Programme, 2nd District Municipality, Budapest
https://margitnegyed.hu/

Filmography

Acting

Producing

Adventures Italian Style (2021), HBO, Italy,
Executive Producer

Tékasztorik 2 (2020)
Co-Executive Producer

Natale a 5 stelle (2018) - Netflix
Berta Molnar, Line Producer

Remélem legközelebb sikerül meghalnod:) (2018)
Co-Producer

Földiek (2017)
(Short) - Co-Producer

Eleonora(2017)
Actress, Producer

Vakfolt (2017)
Line Producer, Producer

Emma (2016)
(Short) - Producer

Madeleine (2015)
Line Producer, Producer

Yes (2013)
(Short) - Woman, Producer

Maternity Blues (2011)
Clara, Producer

Expired (2011)
(Short) - Producer

Above the Clouds (2018– )
(TV Series) - Co-Executive Producer

Television
 First Generation, directed by Szilard Szabo (2001)
 Tea, directed by Gabor Herendi (sitcom; 2003)
 Right of Defense, directed by Gianfranco Lazotti and Donatella Majorca (television episode: "The Trap"; 2004)
 Hunting, directed by Massimo Spano (2005)
 The bell'Antonio, directed by Maurizio Zaccaro (2005)
 Exodus - Dreams of Ada, directed by Gianluigi Calderone (2006)
 Pompeii, directed by Giulio Base (2006)
 58th Festival di Sanremo (2008), with Pippo Baudo, Piero Chiambretti and Bianca Guaccero (co-host)
 The scandal of the Banca Romana, directed by Stefano Reali (2009)
 Sissi, directed by Xaver Schwarzenberger (2009)

Prizes and awards

 Golden Globes, Italy(2012) European Golden Globe for Maternity Blues
 Silver Ribbons, Italy (2012) Biraghi Award as Best Young Actress for Maternity Blues
 International Flaiano Awards (2011) Best Actress for The Swing Girls
 Monte-Carlo Television Festival (2011) Best Actress for The Swing Girls (shared with Lotte Verbeek & Elise Schaap)
 Filmspray (2009) — Best Actress for Il rabdomante, which won the prize for Best Film
 Pro Urbe Tamási (2009) — award for activities in favor of the Hungarian town
 WIFI (Women In Film Italy) Award (2007) — Best Newcomer

References

External links

 
 Official Website

1979 births
Hungarian female models
Hungarian film actresses
Living people
Actresses from Budapest
Hungarian television actresses
21st-century Hungarian actresses
Models from Budapest
European actors